Forever Blue is the fifth studio album by American rock and roll musician Chris Isaak. It was released on May 23, 1995. The album included three singles: the Grammy-nominated "Somebody's Crying"; "Baby Did a Bad Bad Thing," which was featured in Stanley Kubrick's final film, Eyes Wide Shut; and "Graduation Day," featured in the 1996 film Beautiful Girls. In 1996, Forever Blue was also nominated for a Grammy Award for Best Rock Album, though it lost to Alanis Morissette's Jagged Little Pill.

In 2014, a cover of "I Believe" was done by Melissa Hollick for the video game Wolfenstein: The New Order.

Track listing
All songs written by Chris Isaak.

 "Baby Did a Bad Bad Thing" – 2:54
 "Somebody's Crying" – 2:46
 "Graduation Day" – 3:11
 "Go Walking Down There" – 2:49
 "Don't Leave Me on My Own" – 2:14
 "Things Go Wrong" – 3:00
 "Forever Blue" – 2:42
 "There She Goes" – 3:14
 "Goin' Nowhere" – 2:52
 "Changed Your Mind" – 3:51
 "Shadows in a Mirror" – 3:59
 "I Believe" – 3:09
 "The End of Everything" – 3:05

Personnel
Chris Isaak – vocals, guitar
Rowland Salley – bass, vocals
Kenney Dale Johnson – drums, vocals
Bruce Kaphan – pedal steel guitar
Jimmy Pugh – Hammond B3 organ
Johnny Reno – saxophone, vocals
Jeff Watson – lead guitar
Gregg Arreguin – guitar

Charts

Sales and certifications

References

1995 albums
Chris Isaak albums
Reprise Records albums
Albums produced by Erik Jacobsen